King of the Sierras is a 1938 American western directed by Samuel Diege and Arthur Rosson and distributed by Grand National Pictures.

The film is also known as Black Stallion (alternative American title) and Killers of the Prairie in the United Kingdom.

Plot

Cast 
Hobart Bosworth as Uncle Hank
Rex as El Diablo
Harry Harvey Jr. as Tom
Frank Campeau as Jim
Harry Harvey as Pete
Jack Lindell as The Trainer

Soundtrack 
 "Cactus Valley" (Words and Music by Lew Porter)
 "I Want to Be a Buckaroo" (Words and Music by Lew Porter)
 "King of the Sierras" (Written by Jimmy Franklin and Bobby Burns)

External links 

1938 films
American black-and-white films
Grand National Films films
1938 Western (genre) films
American Western (genre) films
Films directed by Arthur Rosson
1930s English-language films
1930s American films